Dionísio Fernandes Mendes (born May 21, 1981 in Bissau), nicknamed Niche, is a Bissau-Guinean football striker.

Career 
Some of his other former teams include Lourinhanense, Torreense, Vilafranquense, Leixões, Barreirense, Stade Tunisien and AEK Larnaca of Cyprus.

References

External links
 
 
 

1981 births
Living people
Sportspeople from Bissau
Bissau-Guinean footballers
Guinea-Bissau international footballers
Bissau-Guinean expatriate footballers
Bissau-Guinean expatriate sportspeople in Portugal
Expatriate footballers in Portugal
Cypriot First Division players
Cypriot Second Division players
Leixões S.C. players
Bissau-Guinean expatriate sportspeople in Tunisia
Expatriate footballers in Tunisia
Bissau-Guinean expatriate sportspeople in Cyprus
Expatriate footballers in Cyprus
AEK Larnaca FC players
APEP FC players
Stade Tunisien players
Bissau-Guinean expatriate sportspeople in Israel
Expatriate footballers in Israel
Bnei Sakhnin F.C. players
C.D. Fátima players
Association football forwards